Woodhill is a suburb of Whangārei, in Northland Region, New Zealand. It is about 1.5 kilometres southwest of the city centre. State Highway 1 runs through Woodhill, bypassing the CBD, and State Highway 14 ends at an intersection with SH1. Whangarei Hospital is on SH14 between Woodhill and Horahora.

History
The area has been called Woodhill since the late 19th century and was developed as "Woodhill Estate" at the beginning of the 20th century Water pipes were laid about 1907. Around 1910–1911, discussions were held by the Whangarei Borough Council about metalling the roads of the estate.

Woodhill was originally part of Whangarei County, but was transferred to Whangarei Borough in 1949.

Demographics

Woodhill-Vinetown had a population of 2,847 at the 2018 New Zealand census, an increase of 408 people (16.7%) since the 2013 census, and an increase of 357 people (14.3%) since the 2006 census. There were 1,095 households, comprising 1,392 males and 1,455 females, giving a sex ratio of 0.96 males per female. The median age was 35.2 years (compared with 37.4 years nationally), with 543 people (19.1%) aged under 15 years, 642 (22.6%) aged 15 to 29, 1,194 (41.9%) aged 30 to 64, and 468 (16.4%) aged 65 or older.

Ethnicities were 64.5% European/Pākehā, 31.8% Māori, 5.5% Pacific peoples, 14.9% Asian, and 1.8% other ethnicities. People may identify with more than one ethnicity.

The percentage of people born overseas was 24.4, compared with 27.1% nationally.

Although some people chose not to answer the census's question about religious affiliation, 46.3% had no religion, 36.2% were Christian, 2.6% had Māori religious beliefs, 2.3% were Hindu, 0.3% were Muslim, 0.9% were Buddhist and 3.8% had other religions.

Of those at least 15 years old, 405 (17.6%) people had a bachelor's or higher degree, and 477 (20.7%) people had no formal qualifications. The median income was $25,700, compared with $31,800 nationally. 198 people (8.6%) earned over $70,000 compared to 17.2% nationally. The employment status of those at least 15 was that 1,107 (48.0%) people were employed full-time, 324 (14.1%) were part-time, and 105 (4.6%) were unemployed.

Notes

Populated places in the Northland Region
Suburbs of Whangārei